The 1953 NASCAR Speedway Division consisted of three races, beginning in Greensboro, North Carolina on June 12 and concluding in Fayetteville, North Carolina on June 28.  There were also two non-championship events.  The season champion was Pete Allen.  This was the final season of the NASCAR Speedway Division. Every driver was American racecar driver and every race in the USA.

Schedule

Final points standings

See also
1953 in NASCAR
1953 AAA Championship Car season

References
 
 
 
 

Speedway Division
NASCAR Speedway Division
NASCAR Speedway Division